Archaeological ruins suggest that Indian Hill Site, an "address restricted landmark" in Beaufort County, in the U.S. state of South Carolina, was inhabited between 900 and 1400 AD. It is believed that the Indian Hill site served as a regional ceremonial center for religious, social and economic functions. The site was listed in the National Register of Historic Places on March 24, 1974.

References

Archaeological sites on the National Register of Historic Places in South Carolina
Geography of Beaufort County, South Carolina
National Register of Historic Places in Beaufort County, South Carolina